David Hai Bitan (born 8 April 1960) is an Israeli lawyer and politician. He currently serves as a member of the Knesset from the Likud party. During 2016-2017 he served as the Chairman of the Coalition and Chairman of the Likud party in the Knesset, and in the 23rd Knesset served as Chairman of the Immigration and Absorption Committee. Israeli attorney general Avichai Mandelblit announced on 26 January 2020 that Bitan would be indicted for "bribery, fraud and breach of trust, as well as money laundering and tax offenses" following a hearing.

Biography
David Bitan was born in Kenitra, Morocco and immigrated to Israel with his family at the age of five. During his national service in the Israel Defense Forces, he served as a combat medic. He then studied law at the Tel Aviv University. After graduating with an L.L.B in 1987 and receiving a law license, he worked as an attorney and later opened his own law firm.

Bitan is married to Hagit, and they have two daughters.

Political career
A member of the Likud party, he became a member of the Rishon LeZion City Council in 1988 after becoming head of the party's Rishon LeZion branch. He went on to become Deputy Mayor of the city.

In 2010 Bitan was investigated for suspicion of ethical and integrity violations. Following the allegations, Bitan waived some of his responsibilities relating to construction within the municipality. Later on he was given responsibilities in the areas of transportation, culture and housing. Following the 2013 municipal elections, he was given back the responsibilities for engineering, along with chairmanship of the municipal sub committee for planning and construction. 

Bitan is a member of the board of trustees of the Jewish Agency for Israel from 2011. 

He was placed 21st on the Likud list for the 2013 Knesset elections, but was moved down to 35th place after Likud agreed to run a joint list with Yisrael Beiteinu. With the alliance winning 31 seats, Bitan did not become a Knesset member. Prior to the 2015 elections he was placed 16th on the Likud list, taking the place reserved for the coastal plain. He was elected to the Knesset as the Likud won 30 seats and was sworn in as a Knesset member on March 31, 2015. He was appointed as chairman of the Knesset committee and in May 2016 he became Chairman of the coalition. 

In October 2017, Bitan was investigated by police for alleged bribery. He was suspected of received money from businessmen to pay off a massive debt while Deputy Mayor of Rishon LeZion. On 7 March 2019, the Israeli police recommended bribery charges against Bitan. 

He was placed 23rd on the Likud party list for the 21st Knesset, and maintained the same place for the 22nd Knesset elections. He was appointed as deputy chairman of the Knesset. 

He was nominated to be Minister of Agriculture on 5 January 2020, but withdrew on 10 January prior to a Knesset vote on his appointment.

In May 2020 he was appointed as Chairman of the Immigration and Absorption committee. 

On 6 July 2021 Bitan was indicted by Attorney General Avichai Mandelblit for seven counts of bribery, money laundering, fraud, breach of trust and tax offenses totaling NIS 715,000.

References

External links

1960 births
Living people
20th-century Israeli lawyers
21st-century Israeli lawyers
Deputy mayors of places in Israel
Deputy Speakers of the Knesset
Israeli Jews
Israeli people of Moroccan-Jewish descent
Jewish Israeli politicians
Likud politicians
Members of the 20th Knesset (2015–2019)
Members of the 21st Knesset (2019)
Members of the 22nd Knesset (2019–2020)
Members of the 23rd Knesset (2020–2021)
Members of the 24th Knesset (2021–2022)
Members of the 25th Knesset (2022–)
Moroccan emigrants to Israel
20th-century Moroccan Jews
People from Kenitra
People from Rishon LeZion
Tel Aviv University alumni